Rupert Gregson-Williams (born 12 October 1966) is a British composer, conductor, and record producer, best known for his film, video game, and television scores. His filmography includes Hotel Rwanda, for which he was awarded the European Film composer award, Hacksaw Ridge, Wonder Woman, Aquaman, Over the Hedge, Bee Movie, Abominable, Back to the Outback, Made of Honor, The Holiday, The Legend of Tarzan, and numerous films by Happy Madison Productions, many of which star Adam Sandler. He composed music for the video game Battlefield 2: Modern Combat. His notable works in television include Veep, Catch-22 and The Crown.

Educated at choir school, Lancing College, and  St John's College, Cambridge, he is the younger brother of film composer Harry Gregson-Williams. He is a member of Hans Zimmer's Remote Control Productions team of composers.

He has received a nomination for a Primetime Emmy Award and is a recipient of a BMI Award and a European Film Award.

Filmography

Feature films

1990s

2000s

2010s

2020s

Television

Video games

Awards

References

External links 
 

1966 births
20th-century English composers
20th-century English male musicians
21st-century English composers
21st-century English male musicians
Alumni of St John's College, Cambridge
Animated film score composers
Anime composers
DreamWorks Animation people
English film score composers
English male film score composers
European Film Award for Best Composer winners
Living people
People educated at Lancing College
Video game composers